Charles Henri André Laverne (1903-1987) was a sailor from France, who represented his country at the 1928 Summer Olympics in Amsterdam, Netherlands.

Sources 
 

Sailors at the 1928 Summer Olympics – 12' Dinghy
Olympic sailors of France
1903 births
1987 deaths
French male sailors (sport)
Sportspeople from Paris